Lee Salem may refer to:

 Lee Salem (poker player), American poker player
 Lee Salem (editor) (1946–2019), American comic strip editor